The Larne Times is a weekly newspaper based in Larne, County Antrim, Northern Ireland. The paper was taken over by Johnston Press in 2005 from Scottish Radio Holdings and is now operated by the holding company, Johnston Publishing (NI).

In 1891 it was founded as The Larne Times and Weekly Telegraph and in 1936 became simply Larne Times.

In 2016, Johnston Press still considered it to be one of its core titles.

References

External links
 

Newspapers published in Northern Ireland
Mass media in County Antrim
Times
Publications established in 1891
1891 establishments in Ireland
Newspapers published by Johnston Press